The Thuringii, Toringi or Teuriochaimai, were an early Germanic people that appeared during the late Migration Period in the Harz Mountains of central Germania, a region still known today as Thuringia. It became a kingdom, which came into conflict with the Merovingian Franks, and it later came under their influence and Frankish control. The name is still used for one of modern Germany's federal states (Bundesländer).

First appearances

The Thuringians do not appear in classical Roman texts under that name, but some have suggested that they were the remnants of the Suebic Hermanduri, the last part of whose name (-duri) could represent the same sound as (-thuri) and the Germanic suffix -ing, suggests a meaning of "descendants of (the [Herman]duri)". This people were living near the Marcomanni. Tacitus in his "Germania", describes their homeland as being where the Elbe starts, but also having colonies at the Danube and even within the Roman province of Rhaetia.

Claudius Ptolemy mentions neither the Hermunduri nor the Thuringians in his geography but instead the Teuriochaemae (Turones, see list of ancient Germanic peoples and tribes), living in just north of the Sudetes mountains, thought to be the Erzgebirge. These may also be connected to later Thuringians. ("Chaemae" may represent a version of the Germanic word for "home". Ptolemy also mentions a people called the Bainochaimai to the west of the Elbe. He also apparently spells the name of the Chamavi in a similar way.) The formation of this people may have had also been influenced by two longer-known tribes more associated with the eastern bank of the lower Elbe river, northeast of Thuringia, because the Carolingian law code written for them was called the "law of the Angles and Varini that is the Thuringians". Much earlier, Tacitus in his "Germania", for example, had grouped these two tribes among the more distant Suebic tribes, living beyond the Elbe, and near a sea where they worshiped Herthus. (Pliny the Elder had listed the Varini as a Vandalic, or East Germanic tribe, rather than Suebian.) These two tribes are among Germanic groups known to have been found north of the Danube in this period. Procopius in his "Gothic Wars" describes the land of the Varini as being south of the Danes, but north of the Slavs, who were in turn north of the uncultivated lands which lay north of the Danube. Procopius describes a marriage alliance between the Angles of Britain and the Varni in the sixth century.

The name of the Thuringians appears to be first mentioned in the veterinary treatise of Vegetius, written early in the fifth century.

They appear in some lists of the peoples involved in Attila's invasion of Gaul. Walter Pohl has also proposed that they may be the same as the Turcilingi (or Torcolingi) who were one of the tribes near the middle Danube after the collapse of the empire of Attila, to whom they had apparently all been subject. They are specifically associated with Odoacer, who later became King of Italy, and are sometimes thought to have formed a part of the Sciri. Other tribes in this region at the time included the Rugii and the Heruls. Sidonius Apollinaris, in his seventh poem, explicitly lists them among the allies who fought under Attila when he entered Gaul in 451. During the reign of Childeric I, Gregory of Tours and Fredegar record that the Frankish King married the runaway wife of the King of the Thuringians, but the story may be distorted. (For example, the area of Tongeren, now in Belgium, may have been intended.)

More clearly, correspondence is recorded with a kingdom of Thuringians by Procopius and Cassiodorus during the reigns of Theoderic the Great (454–526) and Clovis I (approx. 466–511), after the downfall of Attila and Odoacer.

Political history

The Thuringii established an empire in the late fifth century. It reached its territorial peak in the first half of the sixth before it was conquered by the Franks in 531–532. Examination of Thuringian grave sites reveal cranial features which suggest the strong presence of Hunnic women or slaves, perhaps indicating that many Thuringians took Hunnic wives or Hunnic slaves following the collapse of the Hunnic Empire. There is also evidence from jewellery found in graves that the Thuringians sought marriages with Ostrogothic and Lombard women. Under the leadership of Alboin, a large group of Thuringii joined the Lombards on their migration into Italy. The Lombard king Agilulf (590–616) was of Thuringian descent.

After their conquest, the Thuringii were placed under Frankish duces (dukes), but they rebelled and had regained their independence by the late seventh century under Radulf. Towards the end of this century, parts of Thuringia came under Saxon rule.

By the time of Charles Martel and Saint Boniface, they were again subject to the Franks and ruled by Frankish dukes with their seat at Würzburg in the south. Under Martel, the Thuringian dukes' authority was extended over a part of Austrasia and the Bavarian plateau. The valleys of the Lahn, Main, and Neckar rivers were included. The Naab formed the south-eastern border of Thuringia at the time. The Werra and Fulda valleys were within it also and it reached as far as the Saxon plain in the north. Its central location in Germania beyond the Rhine was the reason it became the point d'appui of Boniface's mission work.

The Thuringii had a separate identity as late as 785–786, when one of their leading men, Hardrad, led an abortive insurrection against Charlemagne. The Carolingians codified the Thuringian legal customs (but perhaps did not use them extensively) as the Lex Thuringorum and continued to exact a tribute of pigs, presumably a Merovingian imposition, from the province. In the tenth century, under the Ottonians, the centre of Thuringian power lay in the north-east, near Erfurt. As late as the end of the tenth century, the porcine tribute was still being accepted by the King of Germany.

Ecclesiastical history
Christianity had reached the Thuringii in the fifth century, but their exposure to it was limited. Their real Christianisation took place, alongside the ecclesiastical organisation of their territory, during the early and mid eighth century under Boniface, who felled their "sacred oak" at Geismar in 724, abolishing the vestiges of their paganism.

In the 1020s, Aribo, Archbishop of Mainz, began the minting of coins at Erfurt, the oldest market town in Thuringia with a history going back to the Merovingian period. The economy, especially trade (such as with the Slavs), greatly increased after that.

Social history
The Thuringian nobility, which had an admixture of Frankish, Thuringian, and Saxon blood, was not as landed as that of Francia. There was also a larger population of free peasant farmers than in Francia, though there was still a large number of serfs. The obligations of serfs there were also generally less oppressive. There were also fewer clergymen before Boniface came. There was a  small number of artisans and merchants, mostly trading with the Slavs to the east. The town of Erfurt was the easternmost trading post in Frankish territory at the time.

Historiography
The history of the Thuringii is best known from the writings concerning their conquerors, the Franks. Gregory of Tours, a Gallo-Roman, includes the nearest account in time of the fall of the Thuringian Empire. Widukind of Corvey, writing in tenth-century Saxony, inundates his similar account with various legends.

The Thuringii make brief appearances in contemporary Italian sources when their activities affect the land south of the Alps. Procopius, the Eastern Roman author, mentions them and speaks of their fall. The seventh-century Origo Gentis Langobardorum mentions a king of the Thuringii, Fisud, as a contemporary of Theudebert I.

Sources
Reuter, Timothy. Germany in the Early Middle Ages 800–1056. New York: Longman, 1991.
Thompson, James Westfall. Feudal Germany. 2 vol. New York: Frederick Ungar Publishing Co., 1928. 
Schutz, Herbert. The Germanic Realms in Pre-Carolingian Central Europe, 400–750. American University Studies, Series IX: History, Vol. 196. New York: Peter Lang, 2000.

See also

List of Germanic peoples 
Barbarian invasions
Turcilingi

Notes

 
History of Thuringia
Harz
Early Germanic peoples
German tribes
Barbarian kingdoms